The Mahmudi beylik, founded in 1406 in the south of Van, by the Mahmudi, a Kurdish tribe from Azerbaijan or Botan region, was a Kurdish principality which ruled the Hakkari and Donboli districts for a certain time.

History
In 1406, the Turkish ruler Kara Yusuf gave some districts in Van to the Mahmudi tribe and established a beylik called 'Mahmudi Beylik' or Mahmudi government.  This beylik was tabbi to Karakoyunlu and Aq Qoyunlu respectively. During the Aq Qoyunlu administration, it was ruled by Hüseyin bey. Supported by Aq Qoyunlu Turkmen, the Mahmudis took Albari (Başkale) and
Shambo districts from the Emirate of Hakkari and with the help of Hakkari Bey Izzettin Şir Bitlis pushed the mahmudis away
Man. During the reign of Mahmudi the Safavid was subordinated to Ismail I, and Ismail I Safavid, son of Ardebil Sheikh, defeated him in the battle he conquered with the Aq Qoyunlu Sultan of 1503, occupying his lands and arresting the Kurdish rulers.
When the Ottomans were victorious in the war of Caldiran, some Kurdish rulers in the region joined the Ottoman Empire.  Mahmudi Beys maintained their allegiance to Shah Ismail and later to Shah Tahmasp.  During the first Iranian expedition in 1533, ıvaz Bey became a Safavid eTabi after the rule of the Ottoman ruler 
Suleiman the Magnificent. In 1537, after the death of Ivaz Bey's son Hamza Bey, Tahmasp I appointed Hasan Bey as the head of the Mahmudis.
When the Ottomans organized an expedition to the region in 1548, this beylik certainly joined the Ottomans when the reigning Mahmudi ruler, Hasan Bey converted from Yazidism to Islam and the beylik became subordinated to the Ottomans.  Hosap Castle, which was occupied by Safavids in 1604, was built by Süleyman Bey in 1643. The castle gate has its own inscriptions. Turkish traveller Evliya Çelebi XVII. he mentions Hosap Castle and Mahmud government in the middle of the century.  About Mahmoud's government: "they are all soldiers with six thousand swords. This is the land of the nobility and there is only one Choogoog Mountain. In a country called Ibrahim Bey. These Mahmuds have entered the fire of tribute and there are tribes of timar and zema. 120 tribes." After Evliya Çelebi, Mahmud Ibrahim Bey was named Judge of the wood in 1650. After Ibrahim Bey, Evliya Bey became the magistrate of Mahmudi.
In 1839, with the control of Müküs Bey Han Mahmud Hoşap, this Principality came to an end.

Bibliography

References

Kurdish people
Kurdish dynasties
Yazidi history